"Joy of a Toy" was the first USA single by the psychedelic rock band Soft Machine. It was released in 1968 to promote the group's debut album The Soft Machine. The single features edited versions of two songs, both being the only known mono mixes from that album. Kevin Ayers would employ the song's title for his debut solo album, Joy of a Toy, a year later, even though it does not feature the song. According to Rob Chapman, the title of the A-side was taken from the name of an otherwise unrelated composition by Ornette Coleman.

Track listing

"Joy of a Toy" (Ayers/Ratledge)
"Why Are We Sleeping?" (Ayers/Ratledge/Wyatt)

Personnel 
Kevin Ayers – bass guitar
Mike Ratledge – keyboards
Robert Wyatt – drums

References 

Kevin Ayers songs
1968 singles
Songs written by Kevin Ayers
Song recordings produced by Chas Chandler
Song recordings produced by Tom Wilson (record producer)
1968 songs
ABC Records singles